Felipe Carrillo Puerto (or simply Carrillo Puerto) is a municipality in the south-central part of the Mexican state of Quintana Roo. The municipal seat is the city of the same name. It was named after the assassinated local politician Felipe Carrillo Puerto.

The municipality borders Tulum Municipality to the north, Othón P. Blanco to the south, José María Morelos to the west, as well as Valladolid, Chichimilá, and Tixcacalcupul in the state of Yucatán to the northwest.

Communities
There were 216 populated localities (localidades) enumerated during the 2010 census, in addition to 167 unpopulated localities. The largest localities (cities, towns, and villages) are:

Demographics

Archaeological landmarks
 Muyil

Media
XENKA-AM, a government-run indigenous community radio station, is based in Felipe Carrillo Puerto.

References

Municipalities of Quintana Roo